The  was an annual award established in 1955 and given out by Bungeishunjū in Japan for gag, one-panel, and satirical manga. The award was also given out for works considered the magnum opus of manga creators.

Past winners of the award include Jōji Yamafuji, Makoto Wada, illustrations by Taku Furukawa, a picture book by Shinto Chō, and parodies by Mad Amano. While the award was given out for illustration, picture books, parodies, and other similar works, the proliferation of the modern manga culture led to more manga artists receiving the awards in recent years.

Bungeishunjū stopped giving out the award in 2002.

Award winners

Sources:

See also

 List of manga awards

References

Manga awards
Awards established in 1955
Japanese awards
Comics awards
1955 establishments in Japan